Carolyne Anyango Omondi (born 27 February 1989), known as Carolyne Anyango, is a Kenyan footballer who plays as a midfielder. She has been a member of the Kenya women's national team.

International career
Anyango played for Kenya at the 2016 Africa Women Cup of Nations.

See also
List of Kenya women's international footballers

References

1989 births
Living people
Kenyan women's footballers
Women's association football midfielders
Kenya women's international footballers